Camping 3 is a 2016 French comedy film directed by Fabien Onteniente. It is a sequel to the 2010 film Camping 2. The film was a box office success, having grossed over US$24.2 million in France, becoming the second highest-grossing domestic film in 2016, with 3,228,313 tickets sold.

Plot
In the summer, the Camping Flots Bleus (Blue Waves Campground) again await holidaying friends: The Pic, Jacky and Laurette, Gatineau, just-divorced Sophia, 37, and Patrick Chirac. This year, Patrick decides to try carpooling. Thinking about traveling across France with Vanessa, he is left with three young Dijon guys: Robert the charmer, Benji the hunk, and José the loudmouth. At the campground, Patrick is forced to test out his new co-sleeping arrangement.

Cast

 Franck Dubosc as Patrick Chirac
 Antoine Duléry as Paul Gatineau
 Claude Brasseur as Jacky Pic
 Mylène Demongeot as Laurette Pic
 Gérard Jugnot as Charmillard
 Michèle Laroque as Anne So
 Sophie Mounicot as Sabrina
 Cristiana Reali as Clotilde
 Louka Meliava as Benji
 Jules Ritmanic as José
 Cyril Mendy as Robert
 Philippe Lellouche as Carello
 Laurent Olmedo as The 37
 Leslie Medina as Morgane
 Amélie Robin as Charlotte
 Eden Ducourant as Aurélie
 Alix Bénézech as Manon
 Clara Antoons as Linda
 Honorine Magnier as Mélanie
 Victoria Olloqui as Valérie
 Yvick Letexier as Kevin
 Aymeric Dapsence as SJ Shogun
 Dominique Prudent as Bressan
 Michel Crémadès as Moustachu
 Yves De Jonghe as Mr. Van de Kerkoff 
 Guilaine Londez as The waitress

References

External links
 

2016 films
2016 comedy films
French comedy films
Films about families
Pathé films
Films directed by Fabien Onteniente
2010s French films